"Is It a Dream?" is a single by English rock band the Damned, released on 9 September 1985 by MCA Records.

The album version from Phantasmagoria was remixed slightly by Jon Kelly for single release, and was backed with several live tracks recorded at the Woolwich Coronet during the band's 11 July 1985 gig. "Is It a Dream?" reached No. 34 in the UK Singles Chart.

Two different music videos were made for the song, one directed by Peter Cornish and a second video featuring live performance footage.

MCA also issued the single in Australia, Germany, Spain, South Africa and Zimbabwe.

Track listing
 "Is It a Dream? (Wild West End Mix)" (Jugg, Scabies, Vanian, Merrick, Sensible) − 3:20
 "Street of Dreams (Live)" (Jugg, Scabies, Vanian, Merrick)

Bonus tracks on 12" single: -

 "Curtain Call (Live)" (Scabies, Sensible, Gray, Vanian) − 4:13 
 "Pretty Vacant (Live)" (Rotten, Matlock, Jones, Cook) 
 "Wild Thing (Live)" (Taylor)

Production credits
 Producer:
 Jon Kelly
 Musicians:
 Dave Vanian − vocals
 Rat Scabies − drums
 Roman Jugg − guitar, keyboards 
 Bryn Merrick − bass
 Additional personnel:
 Paul "Shirley" Shepley − keyboards on live tracks
 Luís Jardim − percussion

External links

1985 singles
The Damned (band) songs
Songs written by Rat Scabies
Songs written by Roman Jugg
Songs written by David Vanian
Songs written by Bryn Merrick
Songs written by Captain Sensible
1985 songs
MCA Records singles